Dave Thiele (born c. 1952) is a Canadian politician. He was a member of the Edmonton City Council, representing Ward 6 alongside Amarjeet Sohi.

Thiele was first elected in 1998, prior to which he worked with the City of Edmonton in the Water Systems department (now Epcor Water).

References

External links
 Official Website

1950s births
Living people
Edmonton city councillors